Melle Springer (born 30 December 1998) is a Dutch footballer who plays for IJVV Stormvogels in the Derde Klasse.

Club career
He made his Eerste Divisie debut for Jong AZ on 1 September 2017 in a game against Jong FC Utrecht.

After two years with Eerste Divisie club SC Telstar, he moved to amateur club IJVV Stormvogels in June 2020, effectively retiring from professional football. Instead, Springer would focus on his studies.

References

External links
 

1998 births
Footballers from Haarlem
Living people
Dutch footballers
Eerste Divisie players
AZ Alkmaar players
SC Telstar players
Association football defenders